Robotic magnetic navigation (RMN) (also called remote magnetic navigation) uses robotic technology to direct magnetic fields which control the movement of magnetic-tipped endovascular catheters into and through the chambers of the heart during cardiac catheterization procedures.

Devices
Because the human heart beats during ablation procedures, catheter stability can be affected by navigation technique. Magnetic fields created by RMN technology guide the tip of a catheter using a “pull” mechanism of action (as opposed to “push” with manual catheter navigation). Magnetic catheter navigation has been associated with greater catheter stability.

Medical use

Atrial fibrilation
As of 2015 there were two robotic catheterization systems on the market for atrial fibrilation; one of them used magnetic guidance.

After long-term follow up, RMN navigation has been associated with better procedural and clinical outcomes for AF ablation when compared with manual catheter navigation for cardiac ablation.

Ventricular tachycardia
RMN has been shown to be safe and effective for cardiac catheter ablation in various patient populations with  ventricular tachycardia.

References

Medical technology